Luka Mratović (born April 7, 1987, Split) is a professional sailor representing Croatia. He competed at the 2008, 2012 Summer Olympics and 2016 Summer Olympics in the men's RS-X windsurfing class.

References 

1987 births
Living people
Croatian male sailors (sport)
Croatian windsurfers
Olympic sailors of Croatia
Sailors at the 2008 Summer Olympics – RS:X
Sailors at the 2012 Summer Olympics – RS:X
Sailors at the 2016 Summer Olympics – RS:X
Sportspeople from Split, Croatia